Three Songs or 3 Songs (also Song Three or variants such as Drei Lieder, Tres canciones and Trois Chansons), may refer to:

Music

Classical compositions
 Three Songs String Quartet No. 1, by Efraín Amaya
Three Songs, Op. 12, by Hubert Parry
 Three Songs to Poems by Arthur Symons (1918–19), three poems set to music by John Ireland
Three Songs to Poems by Thomas Hardy (1925), three poems set to music by John Ireland 
 Three Songs (Ireland, 1926), three poems by various poets set to music by John Ireland in 1926 
3 Strindbergsvisor for mixed choir a cappella (1959), Three Songs by Ingvar Lidholm 
Three Songs (W. H. Davies); see List of compositions by Arthur Bliss
3 Songs, Op. 3b, by Ib Nørholm

Drei Lieder
 Drei Lieder (Stockhausen)
 Drei Lieder nach Shakespeare

Tres canciones
Tres canciones españolas, by Joaquín Rodrigo
Tres canciones españolas, by Antón García Abril
Tres canciones de Segovia, by Carmelo Bernaola
Tres Canciones, by Blas Galindo Dimas
Tres Canciones, by Benjamín Gutiérrez
Tres Canciones, by Oscar Espla
Tres Canciones, by Alberto Soriano
Tres Canciones, by Jose Moreno Gans 
Tres canciones campesinas, by Cesar Perez Sentenat (also composed "Tríptico de villancicos")
Tres canciones (Byron) (1954) by Alicia Terzian
Tres canciones negras (1946) by Xavier Montsalvatge
Tres Canciones Campesinas de Chile, by Jorge Urrutia-Blondel

Trois Chansons
Trois Chansons, Op. 11, by Benjamin C. S. Boyle
Trois chansons de Charles d’Orléans by Claude Debussy
Trois Chansons, Op. 20, by Jean Martinon
Trois Chansons by Maurice Ravel
Trois chansons, List of compositions by Lord Berners
Trois chansons Op. 20 (1938), Jean Martinon

Albums
 Three Songs EP, 2012 EP by Twenty One Pilots
 Three Songs (Tall Dwarfs EP), 1981 EP by Tall Dwarfs
 3 Songs (Fugazi EP), 1990 EP by Fugazi
 3-Song EP (Royal Trux EP), 1998 EP by Royal Trux
 A Three Song Recording, 1999 single by The Black Heart Procession
 Three Songs, 2002 EP by Papa M
 3 Songs (Tumbledown EP), 2007 EP by Tumbledown
 Tres Canciones, 1976 album by Diomedes Díaz

Songs
 "3" (Britney Spears song), 2009
 "3 a.m." (Eminem song), 2009
 "3" (Disturbed song), 2011
 "Song Three", a song from the Mahagonny-Songspiel, 1927
 "Song 3", a song from the 2002 Robbie Williams album Escapology (album)

See also
 3 (disambiguation)
 Trois mélodies, Op. 7 (Fauré) (3 melodies)